Passeio Alegre is a square in Póvoa de Varzim City Center in Portugal, and is listed by IGESPAR as an urban site with public relevance.

Passeio Alegre is a beach squared with esplanades and a stage for outdoor performances. Due to the area's popularity in the region, the square is served by two underground parking venues: The one under the extension of Mousinho de Albuquerque Avenue to the north and the one in front of the Casino, to the south. Passeio Alegre can be translated into English as "Glad Stroll".

History

Urban morphology

Listed heritage
 Passeio Alegre (free space with patrimonial relevance)
 Grande Hotel
 Casino da Póvoa
 Diana Bar

Landmarks in Póvoa de Varzim
Squares in Póvoa de Varzim